During the 1998–99 English football season, Everton F.C. competed in the FA Premier League (known as the FA Carling Premiership for sponsorship reasons).

Season summary
Everton continued to look a shadow of their former selves after Howard Kendall made way for new manager Walter Smith, though their 14th place finish was a three-place improvement upon last season's near miss with relegation. With Smith having achieved so much success north of the border with Rangers, he had been expected to bring some success to the blue half of Merseyside after two seasons of misery, but there was little for the Goodison Park faithful to shout about.

Off the field during the season in December, there was a chairmanship change in the boardroom when Peter Johnson quit after 11 years with the club following a row with manager Smith after the Everton boss controversially sold Duncan Ferguson to Newcastle United for £7m and Philip Carter took over the reins.

Final league table

Results summary

Results by round

Results
Everton's score comes first

Legend

FA Premier League

FA Cup

League Cup

First-team squad
Squad at end of season

Left club during season

Reserve squad

Statistics

Appearances, goals and cards
(Starting appearances + substitute appearances)

Starting 11
Considering starts in all competitions
 GK: #1,  Thomas Myhre, 45
 RB: #12,  Craig Short, 24
 CB: #15,  Marco Materazzi, 32
 CB: #5,  Dave Watson, 26
 LB: #6,  David Unsworth, 39
 CM: #10,  Don Hutchison, 36
 CM: #4,  Olivier Dacourt, 34
 LM: #3,  Michael Ball, 42
 CF: #26,  Ibrahima Bakayoko, 20
 CF: #29,  Danny Cadamarteri, 17

References

Everton F.C. seasons
Everton